Federico "Fritz" Dennerlein (14 March 1936 – 3 October 1992) was an Italian freestyle and butterfly swimmer and water polo player who competed in the 1956, 1960 and 1964 Summer Olympics. He finished fourth in the water polo tournaments in 1956 and 1964, and in the 200 m butterfly event in 1960. He also reached the finals of the 4 × 200 m freestyle (1956) and 4 × 100 m medley (1960) relays.

Dennerlein was born to a German father and Romanian mother; he had an elder brother Costantino, also a competitive swimmer. Between 1959 and 1962 he set five European records in the 100 and 200 m butterfly events. He aimed for a butterfly medal at the 1960 Olympics, and therefore gave up his place in the Olympic water polo team. After retiring from competitions he worked as a coach in his native Naples. Since 1984 he trained the national water polo team, bringing it to a silver medal at the 1986 World Championships. He died in a traffic accident, and was buried in the English Cemetery, Naples.

References

External links

1936 births
1992 deaths
Italian male butterfly swimmers
Italian male water polo players
Italian people of Romanian descent
Italian people of German descent
Olympic swimmers of Italy
Olympic water polo players of Italy
Swimmers at the 1956 Summer Olympics
Swimmers at the 1960 Summer Olympics
Water polo players at the 1956 Summer Olympics
Water polo players at the 1964 Summer Olympics
People from Portici
European Aquatics Championships medalists in swimming
Road incident deaths in Italy
Mediterranean Games gold medalists for Italy
Mediterranean Games silver medalists for Italy
Water polo players at the 1955 Mediterranean Games
Swimmers at the 1959 Mediterranean Games
Swimmers at the 1963 Mediterranean Games
Universiade medalists in swimming
Universiade medalists in water polo
Mediterranean Games medalists in water polo
Mediterranean Games medalists in swimming
Universiade gold medalists for Italy
Medalists at the 1959 Summer Universiade
Medalists at the 1963 Summer Universiade
Italian male freestyle swimmers
Italian water polo coaches
Italy men's national water polo team coaches
Sportspeople from the Province of Naples